Mutya ng Pilipinas 2017, was the 49th edition of Mutya ng Pilipinas. It was held at the Newport Performing Arts Theater in Resorts World Manila, Pasay, Metro Manila, Philippines on August 4, 2017. 

At the end of the event, Ganiel Krishnan crowned Ilene de Vera as Mutya ng Pilipinas Asia Pacific International 2017. Including her crowned are the new court of winners: Jannie Alipo-on was crowned as Mutya ng Pilipinas Tourism International 2017, Hannah Khayle Iglesia was crowned as Mutya ng Pilipinas Tourism Queen of the Year International 2018, and Savannah Mari Gankiewicz was crowned as Mutya ng Pilipinas Overseas Filipino Communities 2017. Angela Sandigan was named First Runner-Up, while Sofia Sibug was named Second Runner-Up.

Results
Color keys
  The contestant Won in an International pageant.
  The contestant was a Runner-up in an International pageant.
  The contestant was a Semi-Finalist in an International pageant.

Special Awards

Contestants
30 contestants competed for the four titles.

References

External links 
 

2017
Mutya ng Pilipinas 2017
2017 in the Philippines